Dan Demole (born 1979) is an American entrepreneur, co-founder and Co-CEO of the music company Slip.stream. He is the former co-founder and COO of Jingle Punks Music. He has been featured in Billboard, Variety, and Business Week.

Prior to starting his first company Jingle Punks Music, he spent two years traveling in Africa, Asia, Australia and Central America  before landing in New York city.  Originally from Florida, Demole worked for L-3 Communications and Electronic Arts and was a graduate of the University of Central Florida, receiving a BS degree in computer science.

Jingle Punks 
Dan Demole started Jingle Punks Music with musician and television editor Jared Gutstadt after meeting at a Black Keys concert in Brooklyn, New York. Within months of launching the company, they released their platform, "The Jingle Player". Developed by Demole with industry knowledge input from Gutstadt, it helped them differentiate themselves quickly from their competitors. The web-based music player was built on proprietary, patented technology that provided targeted music selections for licensing purposes. With a catalog of nearly 500k songs, it forms one of the largest publishing libraries in the world.

In late 2012, talent agency William Morris Endeavor acquired a majority stake  in Jingle Punks, aiming to cultivate synergies across their music and entertainment verticals.  Only two years later, the company was again sold to ole Music Publishing (now Anthem Entertainment) in March 2015, after growing its revenue from $5 million in 2011 to more than $18 million in 2014.  Demole served as the Managing Director of Jingle Punks in their Tribeca office in New York City before being promoted to Global President, Anthem Production Music Group in 2019.

Slip.stream 
In 2021, he founded a new music licensing business, Slip.stream, along with co-founders David Carson and Jesse Korwin. The company raised $3.25m of venture funding from Third Prime Capital, LightShed Ventures, Operator Partners, and Dash Fund. Six time grammy winning artist and producer T-Pain joined the Slip.stream Advisory board and also released his collection of royalty free music, The Pizzle Pack 3, through the company in October 2021.

Slip.stream raised $7.5m in May 2022 from investors Sony Music Entertainment, Third Prime, and Lightshed Ventures. “We’ve long believed that the music industry was ready to explore innovative models addressing creators and streamers’ need for quality music in their content. This funding round along with our new partners is validation of this belief. It’s a win and a step in the right direction for creators and musicians everywhere," Dan was quoted as saying in Music Business Worldwide.

References

External links
Slip.stream
Anthem Entertainment
Jingle Punks Music

1979 births
Living people
American entertainment industry businesspeople
University of Central Florida alumni
American chief executives